John Matthew Zwach Sr. (February 8, 1907 – November 11, 1990) is an American farmer, rural school teacher, and politician. Zwach was most notably a U.S. Representative from Minnesota. He also served for several terms in the Minnesota legislature.

Biography

Zwach was born in Gales Township, Redwood County, Minnesota, the son of Austrian immigrants. He attended the public schools and graduated from Milroy High School in 1926. He then received a teaching certificate from Mankato State College (now Minnesota State University, Mankato) in 1927 and graduated from the University of Minnesota in 1933. He worked as a school teacher and superintendent for fourteen years and was also an active farmer.

Zwach served in the Minnesota House of Representatives from 1934 to 1946. He was a member of the Minnesota Senate from 1946 to 1966 and was the majority leader from 1959 to 1966, leading the Conservative Caucus in the nonpartisan body.  He was also a member of the Interim Agriculture Commission, 1955–1957.

He was elected as a Republican to the 90th, 91st, 92nd and 93rd congresses, (January 3, 1967 – January 3, 1975). He was not a candidate for reelection in 1974.

He was a resident of Lucan, Minnesota until his death on November 11, 1990. He was buried at St. Michael's Cemetery. His daughter, Barb Sykora, served in the Minnesota House of Representatives from 1995 to 2007.

References
Minnesota Legislators Past and Present

1907 births
1990 deaths
20th-century American politicians
American people of Austrian descent
American people of Czechoslovak descent
School superintendents in Minnesota
Republican Party members of the Minnesota House of Representatives
Republican Party Minnesota state senators
People from Redwood County, Minnesota
Minnesota State University, Mankato alumni
University of Minnesota alumni
Republican Party members of the United States House of Representatives from Minnesota
20th-century American educators
Schoolteachers from Minnesota